Stephen Hyatt Pell (February 3, 1874 – 1950), or Stephen Hyatt Pelham Pell was the son of John Howland Pell and Caroline Hyatt. He was born in Flushing Meadows, Queens, New York and died in New York City, New York. Pell was married to Sarah Gibbs Thompson, the daughter of Robert Means Thompson, a mining investor and operator founder of International Nickel, the forerunner of Vale Inco. Pell was a history enthusiast and collector who restored the ruins of Fort Ticonderoga..  From 1944 to 1949 Pell served as president of the American Numismatic Society.

See also
Fort Ticonderoga

References

Sources
USGenNet: Stephen Hyatt Pell

Bibliography
Massachusetts Magazine: Pell Family Tree
Schenectady Gazette: S.H.P. Pell Honorary Doctorate Union College
Biography at the American Numismatic Society

1874 births
People from Essex County, New York
Yale University alumni
1950 deaths
People from Queens, New York
Pell family